Thomas Cunningham Wilson (born 1959) is a Canadian rock musician from Hamilton, Ontario. A veteran of the Canadian music scene, Wilson has been a writer and performer for many years. Wilson's eclectic musical style has ranged from the psychobilly / R&B sounds of the Florida Razors, to the western/roots style of Blackie and the Rodeo Kings and the funk/blues-inspired rock of Junkhouse.

Early life
Wilson grew up in Hamilton, Ontario, secretly adopted and raised by his great-aunt and uncle. Later in life Tom discovered his birth parents, Louis Beauvais and Jane Lazare, both Mohawk from Kahnawake. Tom did not confirm his Mohawk identity until he was an adult. Wilson discovered the truth about his adoption, by chance, a speaking tour handler who had been an old friend of his great-aunt mentioned she had been there the day he was adopted.

Career
Tom Wilson's first performing band was The Florida Razors, formed in 1981 with bassist Carl Keesee, guitarist Jason Avery and drummer Greg Cannon. They released one full length album, Beat Music, in 1986 but dissolved in 1987.

In the 1990s Wilson fronted the band Junkhouse. Junkhouse released three studio albums and a number of singles.

In 1996 he joined with Colin Linden, Stephen Fearing to form the roots rock trio Blackie and the Rodeo Kings.

In 1999 Wilson performed solo as part of The White Ribbon Concert at the Phoenix Concert Theatre in Toronto.

In 2001 Wilson released a solo album, Planet Love, which featured the hit "Dig It". In 2006 he released his second solo album, Dog Years. In between the release of both solo albums, he partnered up with Daniel Lanois's older brother, Bob Lanois, to record The Shack Recordings Volume 1, a collection of quieter acoustic songs with Bob Lanois recording and accompanying him on blues harp on some songs.

It was around this time Wilson and comedian Cathy Jones met and became engaged. They split their time between Hamilton and Nova Scotia, though they never got married.

In 2011 he toured with Blackie and the Rodeo Kings in support of their album Kings and Queens.  That year he performed at the Winnipeg Folk Festival.

In 2015 Wilson was commissioned by the city of Hamilton to paint a mural depicting the history of music in the city.

Wilson's most recent project is Lee Harvey Osmond, which is a collaborative effort with members of Cowboy Junkies and Skydiggers.

His songs have been performed by Mavis Staples, Colin James, Stephen Fearing, Adam Gregory, Billy Ray Cyrus, Craig Northey, David Ricketts and Edwin. Numerous Wilson songs have been used in television, commercials and motion pictures.

In 2017 Wilson published a memoir of his life to date, titled Beautiful Scars. The memoir addressed his discovery of his Mohawk heritage, which he also addressed musically for the first time on Lee Harvey Osmond's 2019 album Mohawk. In 2022 he released Mother Love, a collaborative album with iskwē.

He was the subject of Shane Belcourt's 2022 documentary film Beautiful Scars, which premiered at the 2022 Hot Docs Canadian International Documentary Festival.

Personal life 
In 2006, Wilson was engaged to comedian Cathy Jones. However, they were never married.

Wilson has a daughter, Madeline and a son Thompson from a previous marriage. His son, Thompson Wilson Shaw, is also a musician, formerly part of the folk-rock group Harlan Pepper. They would occasionally tour together, and Harlan Pepper opened for Blackie and the Rodeo Kings on some of their concerts. Since 2015, Wilson has been in a relationship with Margot Burnell.

References

External links

Musicians from Hamilton, Ontario
Canadian male singer-songwriters
Canadian rock singers
Canadian country singer-songwriters
Living people
Place of birth missing (living people)
Canadian alternative country singers
Canadian folk rock musicians
1959 births
Juno Award for Recording Package of the Year winners
First Nations musicians
Canadian Mohawk people
Canadian adoptees